Jair Marrufo (born June 7, 1977) is an American soccer referee.  He has been a referee in Major League Soccer since 2002 and a FIFA referee from 2007 to 2022.

Career
Marrufo was 2008 MLS Referee of the Year.

Marrufo was suspended by MLS for the remainder of the 2009 MLS season as of September 1, 2009, for poor performance over the course of the season, and subsequently on February 5, 2010, Marrufo was removed from the 2010 World Cup referee list.

It was announced in 2013 that Marrufo would be a member of the newly formed Professional Referee Organization, the body responsible for refereeing appointments among the United States and Canada's top soccer leagues.

On July 8, 2014, Marrufo was assigned to the 2014 MLS All-Star Game, to be played on August 6 at Providence Park between an MLS All-Star team and Bayern Munich.

He also officiated a 2017 International Champions Cup match between FC Barcelona and Real Madrid on 29 July 2017, after which he was accused by Barcelona midfielder Ivan Rakitić of insulting him.

Marrufo was selected to officiate in the 2018 FIFA World Cup, and his first appointment was the Group G match between Belgium & Tunisia.

Marrufo refereed the 2018 FIFA Club World Cup Final between Real Madrid and Al Ain FC.

He refereed the second leg of the 2019 Concacaf Champions League Final between C.F. Monterrey and Tigres UANL on May 1, 2019.

On May 17, 2019, Marrufo was appointed to be a referee for the 2019 CONCACAF Gold Cup in the United States.

Personal life
His father, Antonio Marrufo, was a FIFA referee from Mexico and served on the Mexican Referee Commission. Jair Marrufo speaks fluent English and Spanish.
He is the husband of teacher and UTEP graduate Zinnia Mares Marrufo and they have two children together.
He is of Mexican descent.

Honors
 FIFA panel – 2007–2022
 Two Olympic qualifier tournaments
 Beijing Olympics – 2008
 MLS Referee of the Year – 2008
 Two U-17 World Cups
 MLS Cup Playoffs
 Copa Central Americano – 2014
 MLS All-Star Game – 2014
 CONCACAF Gold Cup – 2009, 2011, 2013, 2015
 MLS Cup – 2006, 2015, 2020
 Copa América – 2016
 FIFA World Cup - 2018
 CONCACAF Champions League Final – 2019

Card statistics

References

External links
  (archive)
 
 

1977 births
Living people
American soccer referees
American sportspeople of Mexican descent
People from El Paso, Texas
CONCACAF Champions League referees
CONCACAF Gold Cup referees
Major League Soccer referees
North American Soccer League referees
2018 FIFA World Cup referees
Copa América referees